Arvo Ilmari Salminen (5 August 1896, in Pori – 26 July 1967, in Helsinki) was a Finnish Lutheran clergyman and politician.

He was a member of the National Coalition Party (Finland) and was the chairman of the party in 1946–1954. He served in Parliament in 1945–1948 and again in 1951–1958. He also served as Finnish Minister of Education in the caretaker government from November 17, 1953 to May 5, 1954.

Salminen held a divinity degree as well as a law degree.

References

External links
Brief biography at Finnish Parliament website 
Brief biography at Vihti website 
Brief biography from Arno Forsius 

1896 births
1967 deaths
People from Pori
People from Turku and Pori Province (Grand Duchy of Finland)
20th-century Finnish Lutheran clergy
National Coalition Party politicians
Ministers of Education of Finland
Members of the Parliament of Finland (1945–48)
Members of the Parliament of Finland (1951–54)
Members of the Parliament of Finland (1954–58)
Finnish people of World War II
University of Helsinki alumni